Salkum is a rural unincorporated community in Lewis County, Washington. The town is located on U.S. Route 12 and is 2.1 miles west of Silver Creek.

History

The area was a village of the Cowlitz Indian Tribe. Salkum is a Cowlitz Indian word meaning "boiling water" or "boiling up", a reference to a nearby series of waterfalls on Mill Creek. 

The first non-Native settlers built a grist mill at Mill Creek in 1881, beginning the town's future. A post office was established in 1882 and moved in 1890, shifting the town's center two miles north. Salkum would become a timber community, producing lumber until the 1930s when the sawmills shut down.

Salkum opened its first library, as part of the Timberland Regional Library system, in 1986 as a test to expand library services to rural communities. Proving successful, the community refurbished an unoccupied gas station and the library was moved into the larger building in 1993.

Government and politics

Politics

Salkum is recognized as being majority Republican and conservative. 

The results for the 2020 U.S. Presidential Election for the Salkum voting district were as follows:

 Donald J. Trump (Republican) - 381 (70.82%)
 Joe Biden (Democrat) - 143 (26.58%)
 Jo Jorgensen (Libertarian) - 10 (1.86%)
 Howie Hawkins (Green) - 1 (0.19%)
 Write-in candidate - 3 (0.56%)

References

Populated places in Lewis County, Washington
Unincorporated communities in Lewis County, Washington
Unincorporated communities in Washington (state)